The 2014 Rome Open was a professional tennis tournament played on clay courts. It was the sixth edition of the tournament which was part of the 2014 ATP Challenger Tour. It took place in Rome, Italy between 5 and 10 May 2014.

Singles main-draw entrants

Seeds

 1 Rankings are as of April 28, 2014.

Other entrants
The following players received wildcards into the singles main draw:
  Matteo Donati
  Alessandro Giannessi
  Gianluigi Quinzi
  Matteo Trevisan

The following players received special exempt into the singles main draw:
  Mate Delić
  Miloslav Mečíř Jr.

The following players received entry from the qualifying draw:
  Lamine Ouahab
  Aleksandr Lobkov
  Salvatore Caruso
  Maxim Dubarenco

Doubles main-draw entrants

Seeds

1 Rankings as of April 28, 2014.

Other entrants 
The following pairs received wildcards into the singles main draw:
  Alberto Brizzi /  Walter Trusendi
  Danilo Gargano /  Alesio Luchetti
  Gianluigi Quinzi /  Adelchi Virgili

Champions

Singles

 Julian Reister def.  Pablo Cuevas, 6–3, 6–2

Doubles

 Radu Albot /  Artem Sitak def.  Andrea Arnaboldi /  Flavio Cipolla, 4–6, 6–2, [11–9]

External links
Official Website

Rome Open
Rome Open
Roma